The Lake Chelan AVA is an American Viticultural Area (AVA) in Washington State. Located in the north-central part of the state around Lake Chelan, the area is a sub-appellation of the greater Columbia Valley AVA. Of the 24,040 acres (9,730 hectares) within the AVA's boundaries, only 260 acres (105 hectares) were planted with wine grapes which was producing wine for fifteen wineries as of 2009. While viticulture has existed in the region since 1891, the area was approved as a federally designated wine region in April 2009 when it became Washington's 11th AVA.

History

The first wine grapes were planted in the Lake Chelan region in 1891, but it wasn't until the late 20th century when the area was becoming a popular tourist destination, that a modern wine industry began to develop. In 2002, a group of Chelan wineries started the process of seeking federal recognition as an American Viticultural area. The proposal process was dealt a significant delay when, in the summer of 2007, the Alcohol and Tobacco Tax and Trade Bureau (TTB) issued a "freeze" on approving any AVA petition due to controversy surrounding the proposal for the Calistoga AVA in the Napa Valley region of California. One roadblock that the Lake Chelan AVA petition encountered (which also affected the Calistoga AVA petition) was the requirement that any winery with a name similar to or containing that of the AVA must source at least 85% of their grapes from that AVA. While there is a grandfather clause in the regulation for wineries opened prior to July 7, 1986, there were at least 5 wineries in the Lake Chelan AVA that contained the word "Chelan" in their name and opened after that grandfather clause cut off date. All of these wineries had to submit to the regulation that no more than 15% of the grape used in their wine production would come from outside the Lake Chelan AVA.  

The TTB eventually lifted that freeze and approved the petition for the Lake Chelan AVA in April 2009 with the designation slated to take effect in late May 2008. The approval made the Lake Chelan AVA Washington's 11th AVA and the second wine region in the state to be recognized in 2009, following the January approval of the Snipes Mountain AVA.

Climate and geography

The climate of the Lake Chelan AVA is influenced by the lake itself which creates a "lake effect" that moderates temperatures throughout the growing season and protects against frost damage in winter by re-radiating heat absorbed during the summer in the later months of fall and winter. This has an effect of extending the "hang time" of the fruit on the vine which allows sugars and acids in the grape to stay in balance as phenols develop that can add complexity to the wine.  The AVA is located in north-central Washington, on the eastern half of the state in the Columbia Valley. The Lake Chelan region has a higher elevation and unique soil components that differentiate the area from other wine regions of the Columbia Valley located to the south.

Grapes
A wide range of grapes are planted in the Lake Chelan AVA-including Semillon, Chardonnay, Gewurztraminer, Malbec, Merlot, Orange Muscat, Muscat blanc, Grenache, Cabernet Sauvignon, Cabernet Franc, Sauvignon blanc, Pinot gris, Petite Syrah, Sangiovese, Viognier, Carmenere, Zinfandel, Tempranillo, Petite Verdot, Pinot noir, Riesling, Syrah, Tannat, Dolcetto, Pinot Meunier and Barbera.

References

External links
Official Site

Washington (state) wine
American Viticultural Areas
 
2009 establishments in Washington (state)